The Treehouse may refer to:

A programming block on YTV (TV channel)
The Treehouse (video game) - a 1991 point-and-click computer game made by Broderbund
A medical marijuana Dispensary located in Colorado Springs, Colorado
The Treehouse: Eccentric Wisdom from my Father on How to Live, Love, and See - a book by Naomi Wolf

See also
Treehouse